Bandagi Mian Syed Khundmir (AH 887– 14 Shawwal AH 930; AD 1482/3 – 15 August 1524) was a companion and second of five caliphs (successor) of Mahdavia Sect of Islam founder Muhammad Jaunpuri. Called as Mahdi-e-Mauood. (The Promised One)

References

 Syed Ismail, Sirat-e-Siddiq-e-Vilayat, Markazi Anjuman-e-Mahdavia 

 http://www.khalifatullahmehdi.info/books/english/Aqida-Sharifa-English.pdf 

1480s births
1524 deaths
Indian Muslims
Mahdavi